The John L. Thompson House is a historic house in The Dalles, Oregon, United States. John L. Thompson, an American emigrant and successful blacksmith, built his house in 1889 in a simple, one-story vernacular style. Subsequently, in 1897, the house underwent a significant expansion to become a prominent Queen Anne residence. The house represents the evolution of architecture in frontier towns, and is one of The Dalles' outstanding examples of the Queen Anne style. It was converted to professional offices in 1979.

The house was added to the National Register of Historic Places in 1980.

See also
National Register of Historic Places listings in Wasco County, Oregon
Bennett–Williams House
Hugh Glenn House
Joseph D. and Margaret Kelly House

References

External links

Houses completed in 1889
1889 establishments in Oregon
Houses in The Dalles, Oregon
National Register of Historic Places in Wasco County, Oregon
Houses on the National Register of Historic Places in Oregon
Queen Anne architecture in Oregon